The P&M PulsR is a British ultralight trike, designed by Bill Brooks and produced by P&M Aviation of Rochdale. The aircraft is supplied complete and ready-to-fly.

The design was introduced publicly at the Flying Show in Birmingham in December 2011, where writer Demitri Delemarle reported that it "stole the show", due to its unusual semi-enclosed cockpit design.

Design and development

The design was first shown in 2011 and remained in prototype-only form until 2015.

The aircraft design features a strut-braced topless hang glider-style high-wing, weight-shift controls, a two-seats-in-tandem semi-enclosed cockpit with a cockpit fairing and windshield, tricycle landing gear with main gear wheel pants and a single engine in pusher configuration.

The aircraft fuselage is a monocoque design made from composite carbon fibre, with its double surface wing covered in Dacron sailcloth. Its  span wing is supported by struts and uses an "A" frame weight-shift control bar, which is routed through the open side window spaces in the semi-enclosed fairing. The powerplant is a four-cylinder, air and liquid-cooled, four-stroke, dual-ignition  Rotax 912ULS engine.

Operational history
Writer Demitri Delemarle reports that the design "never fails to attract attention" wherever it is shown, due to its unusual aerodynamic cockpit design, which makes it much faster and gives a better glide ratio than other trikes.

Specifications (PulsR)

References

External links

PulsR
2010s British sport aircraft
2010s British ultralight aircraft
Single-engined pusher aircraft
Ultralight trikes